Mamdudur Rahman Chowdhury (1 January 1946 – 4 April 2018) is a Bangladeshi politician, Former Minister of Shipping and the former Member of Parliament of Bogra-4.

Early life 
Mamdudur Rahman Chowdhury was born on 1 January 1946 in Bogura District. His father's name is Mahbubur Rahman Chowdhury (Putu) and his mother's name is Saira Khatun. His older sister Ismat Ara Sadique was the Minister of State for Public Administration.

Career
Chowdhury was the publisher and editor of the daily Sakal Ananda published from Bogra. He was elected to parliament from Bogra-4 as a Jatiya Party candidate in 1986 and 1988.

He was the Deputy Minister of Communications in the Ershad government. After that he was the Minister of State for Relief, Health and Agriculture. He then served as the Minister of Shipping.

He joined the Bangladesh Nationalist Party after the fall of the Ershad government. He joined the Liberal Democratic Party (LDP) in 2007 and was a member of the Presidium. On 4 January 2016, he left the LDP and formed a party called Bangladesh Janata Party and was the general secretary.

Death 
Ehsan Ali Khan died on 4 April 2018.

References

Jatiya Party politicians
1946 births
3rd Jatiya Sangsad members
4th Jatiya Sangsad members
2018 deaths
Shipping ministers of Bangladesh